Immortals, LLC, doing business as Immortals Gaming Club (IGC), is a collective esports and gaming company. The company rebranded from Immortals to Immortals Gaming Club in 2019 after they acquired Brazil's Gamers Club. IGC owns and operates IGC Esports, which houses the Immortals, MIBR, and the Los Angeles Valiant, and also has a partnership with the Brazilian sports club Corinthians.

Investors 
Investors for the group include Anschutz Entertainment Group, Peter Levin, the president of Lionsgate Interactive Venture and Games, who co-founded Nerdist; Allen Debevoise, former chairman at Machinima.com; Steve Kaplan, a co-owner of the NBA's Memphis Grizzlies; serial entrepreneur Brian Lee, Meg Whitman, entertainment industry venture capitalists Machine Shop Ventures, and others.

Subsidiaries 

 Immortals
 Los Angeles Valiant
 MIBR
 Gamers Club

Partnerships 
 Corinthians

References